Taito Waqavakatoga is a Fijian politician and former civil servant who served as President of the Senate from 2001 to 2006, when he retired from that body.  He was chosen to represent Rewa Province as one of 14 nominees of the Great Council of Chiefs, and the Senate subsequently elected him to preside over the upper chamber of the nation's legislature.

On 7 December 2005, Waqavakatoga confirmed that he was the coordinator of a local group affiliated to the Inter Religious Federation For World Peace International, which has ties to the controversial Unification Church.  He joined Opposition Leader Mahendra Chaudhry in criticizing a government decision to ban Moon, who had been scheduled to address a conference in Nadi on 6 December, from visiting Fiji.  He would have contributed positively to the country, Waqavakatoga said.

As a former civil servant, Waqavakatoga served all over Fiji. He is better known for his proactive role in organising the harvest of sugar cane in the Labasa and Seaqaqa districts, during a harvest boycott by farmers protesting the 1987 1987 military takeover by Sitiveni Rabuka.

References

Year of birth missing (living people)
Living people
Presidents of the Senate (Fiji)
Fijian civil servants
I-Taukei Fijian members of the Senate (Fiji)
Politicians from Rewa Province